Sepp Biebl (born 30 December 1936) is a German speed skater. He competed in the men's 5000 metres event at the 1960 Winter Olympics.

References

1936 births
Living people
German male speed skaters
Olympic speed skaters of the United Team of Germany
Speed skaters at the 1960 Winter Olympics
Place of birth missing (living people)
20th-century German people